NGC 4980 is a spiral galaxy in the southern constellation of Hydra. The shape of NGC 4980 appears slightly deformed, something which is often a sign of recent tidal interactions with another galaxy. In this galaxy's case, however, this appears not to be the case as there are no other galaxies in its immediate vicinity.

Gallery

References

External links
 

Spiral galaxies
4980
Hydra (constellation)